Daniel Cramer (Daniel Candidus) (20 January 1568 – 5 October 1637) was a German Lutheran theologian and writer from Reetz (Recz), Brandenburg. He was an opponent of the Ramists and the Jesuits.

Life
He became professor and archdeacon at Stettin. Earlier, in the 1590s, he was at the University of Marburg, writing on Aristotle.

Writings
Cramer is remembered for his emblem book The True Society of Jesus and the Rosy Cross (1617). It was reprinted with different titles: Emblemata sacra (1624), and Emblematum sacrorum (1627), composed with the academic and poet Conrad Bachmann (1572-1646). The 1624 edition (with 50 emblems) is the better known. This was followed by the Octaginta emblemata moralia nova (1630).
The common denominator of all the Cramer's emblems is a mystic heart, represented in the most different situations: chained, crowned, nailed to a cross, to the roots of a rosary, endowed with wings, undermined by the devil, and so on.

The books of emblems composed by Daniel Cramer are considered by some scholars (for example Adam McLean and Giordano Berti) as expressions of the Rosicrucian thought. Indeed, various clues suggest that Cramer was a member of the Rosicrucian brotherhood.

Daniel Cramer wrote also neo-Latin drama, and controversial works in theology. For the Duke of Pomerania, Philipp II, he became involved in writing the church history Pomerania; his preaching in front of Philipp is recorded.

Works
Areteugenia drama 
Plagium (1593) drama
Isagoge in Metaphysicam Aristotelis (1594)
Synopsis trium librorum rhetoricorum Aristotelis (Stettin, 1597)
Extract und kurtzer warhafftiger Bericht vom Colloquio zu Regensburg, zwischen unsern Theologen ... und den Gehsuiten (Stettin, 1602)
Methodus concionandi, de interpretatione cujusvis textus biblici, tam artificiosa quam populari (Stettin, 1605)
Das Grosse Pomrische Kirchen-Chronicon, four volumes (Stettin, 1628)

References

Sources 
Adam McLean (editor), Fiona Tait (translator)(1991) The Rosicrucian Emblems of Daniel Cramer: The True Society of Jesus and the Rosy Cross
Sabine Mödersheim (1994) "Domini Doctrina Coronat". Die geistliche Emblematik Daniel Cramers (1568-1637)
Wolfgang Harms and Michael Schilling (editors of reprint) (1994) Daniel Cramer: Emblemata Sacra
Angela Baumann-Koch (2001) Frühe lutherische Gebetsliteratur bei Andreas Musculus und Daniel Cramer
Friedrich Wagnitz (Kiel 2001), Daniel Cramer (1568-1637). Ein Leben in Stettin um 1600

External links
 entries of Daniel Cramer in Rostock Matrikelportal
 Biobibliography
Emblem Mollesco
Emblem Praedestinor
Emblem Probor
The Sibyl of the Heart. History and Contents

1568 births
1637 deaths
German Lutheran theologians
People from Choszczno County
People from the Margraviate of Brandenburg
University of Rostock alumni
Academic staff of the University of Marburg
17th-century German Protestant theologians
German male non-fiction writers
17th-century German writers
17th-century German male writers